Walter Gabathuler (born 20 June 1954) is a Swiss equestrian. He competed in two events at the 1988 Summer Olympics.

References

External links
 

1954 births
Living people
Swiss male equestrians
Olympic equestrians of Switzerland
Equestrians at the 1988 Summer Olympics
Place of birth missing (living people)
20th-century Swiss people